Rand-Avery, also known as Rand, Avery, & Company was a printing company in Boston during the 19th century. The company went bankrupt in 1888. Rand Avery Supply Co. was a successor firm and continued into the 20th century.

History
George Curtis Rand (13 December 13, 1819 - December 30, 1878) established Rand, Avery & Company. He was related to  William Rand, who was one of the founding members of Rand, McNally & Company, and  Franklin Rand, publisher of the Zion's Herald.

Promoter and controversial muckracker Tom Lawson (muckraker) took over the firm and liquidated it after losing a battle with its directors.

The company occupied several buildings including 117 Franklin Street in Boston, Massachusetts.

Publications
The firm printed sailing cards, travel and sightseeing guides for rail passengers, and area histories.

It published Harriet E. Wilson's novel Our Nig in 1959.

In 1860, the firm was a printer for Walt Whitman.

The firm printed the first edition of Uncle Tom's Cabin.

It was one of the printers of Mark Twain's The Prince and the Pauper. It also published Edwin M. Bacon's Dictionary of Boston in 1883 and included an advertisement insert with an engraved drawing of a printing operation. It printed a herald for the Barnum and London Circus.

The company printed documents for railroads including maps.

Moses King worked at the firm before moving on to establish his own printing company.

References

Printing companies of the United States